The 2012–13 Sheffield Shield season was the 111th season of the Sheffield Shield, the domestic first-class cricket competition of Australia. The competition was won by Tasmania. It was one of the most tightly contested seasons in many years, with all six teams having a chance to make the final heading into the last round of the regular season.

Table

Updated to completion of season.

Fixtures

September 2012

October 2012

November 2012

January 2013

February 2013

March 2013

Final

Statistics

Most runs

High scores

Most wickets

Best bowling

References

External links
 2012–13 Sheffield Shield at ESPNcricinfo.com

Sheffield Shield
Sheffield Shield
Sheffield Shield seasons